Matthew Paul Hunt (born 10 June 1977) is an English cricketer.  Hunt is a right-handed batsman who bowls right-arm medium pace.  He was born at Newton Abbot, Devon.

Hunt made his debut for Devon in the 1995 Minor Counties Championship against Wiltshire.  Between 1995 and 2006, he represented the county in 38 Championship matches, the last of which came against Dorset.  In 1999, he made his debut for Devon in the MCCA Knockout Trophy, which came against Dorset.  From 1999 to 2006, he represented the county in 12 Trophy matches, the last of which came against Dorset.

2002 saw him make his List A debut for Devon, against Cumberland in the 2nd round of the 2003 Cheltenham & Gloucester Trophy which was played in 2002.  From 2002 to 2004, he represented the county in 5 List A matches, the last of which came against Yorkshire at The Maer Ground in the 3rd round of the 2004 Cheltenham & Gloucester Trophy.  In his 5 List A matches, he scored 206 runs at a batting average of 41.20, with a single two half centuries and a high score of 72.

Hunt has played Second XI cricket for the Somerset Second XI and the Gloucestershire Second XI.

References

External links
Matthew Hunt at Cricinfo
Matthew Hunt at CricketArchive

1977 births
Living people
People from Newton Abbot
Cricketers from Devon
English cricketers
Devon cricketers